The lily-white movement was an anti-black political movement within the Republican Party in the United States in the late 19th and early 20th centuries. It was a response to the political and socioeconomic gains made by African-Americans following the Civil War and the Thirteenth Amendment to the Constitution, which eliminated slavery "except as punishment for a crime".

During Reconstruction, black leaders in Texas and around the country gained increasing influence in the Republican Party by organizing blacks as an important voting bloc via Union Leagues and the biracial black-and-tan faction of the Republicans. Conservative whites attempted to eliminate this influence and recover white voters who had defected to the Democratic Party.

Terminology 
The term lily-white movement was coined by black Texas Republican leader Norris Wright Cuney, who used the term in an 1888 state Republican convention to describe efforts by white conservatives to oust blacks from positions of Texas Republican party leadership and incite riots to divide the party.

The term came to be used nationally to describe this ongoing movement as it further developed in the early 20th century.

Background

Immediately following the war all of the Southern states enacted "Black Codes," laws intended specifically to curtail the rights of the newly freed African Americans. Many Northern states enacted their own "Black Codes" restricting or barring black immigration. The Civil Rights Act of 1866, however, nullified most of these laws, and the federal Freedman's Bureau was able to regulate many of the affairs of Southern blacks, who were granted the right to vote in 1867. Groups such as the Union League and the Radical Republicans sought total equality and complete integration of blacks into American society. The Republican Party itself held significant power in the South during Reconstruction because of the federal government's role.

During Reconstruction, Union Leagues were formed across the South after 1867 as all-black working auxiliaries of the Republican Party. They were secret organizations that mobilized freedmen to register to vote and to vote Republican. They discussed political issues, promoted civic projects, and mobilized workers opposed to certain employers. Most branches were segregated, but a few were integrated. The leaders of the all-black units were mostly urban blacks from the North who had never been enslaved. Historian Eric Foner reports:

During the 19th century, a small number of African Americans were elected to the United States Congress; all were members of the Republican Party. In the South, the party was a voting coalition of Freedmen (freed slaves), Carpetbaggers (derogatory term used by southern whites for recent arrivals from the north), and Scalawags (derogatory term describing those southern whites who had been loyal to the US during the Civil War). In the South, the Republican Party gradually came to be known as "the party of the Negro." In Texas, blacks comprised 90% of the party members during the 1880s.

The Democratic Party increasingly came to be seen by many in the white community as the party of respectability. The first Ku Klux Klan targeted violence against black Republican leaders and seriously undercut the Union League.

Republican factionalism
Black Republicans increasingly demanded more and more offices at the expense of the Scalawags.  The more numerous Black-and-tan element typically won the factional battles; many Scalawags joined the opposing lily-whites or switched to the Democrats.

Following the death of Texas Republican leader Edmund J. Davis in 1883, Black civil rights leader Norris Wright Cuney rose to the Republican chairmanship in Texas, becoming a national committeeman in 1889. While Black Americans were a minority overall in Texas, Cuney's rise to this position caused a backlash among white conservative Republicans in other areas, leading to the Lily-whites becoming a more organized, nationwide effort. Cuney himself coined the term "Lily-white movement" to describe rapidly intensifying organized efforts by white conservatives to oust Black Republicans from positions of party leadership and incite riots to divide the party. Some authors contend that the effort was coordinated with Democrats as part of a larger movement toward disenfranchisement of Black people in the South by increasing restrictions in voter registration rules.

Downfall of black Republicans
By 1890, with a few brief exceptions, the Democratic Party had gained control of all state legislatures in the South. From 1890 to 1908, Southern states accomplished disenfranchisement of blacks and—in some states—many poor whites.

During the first three decades of the 20th century, no blacks served in the U.S. Congress due to their disenfranchisement across the South. Black leaders were barred in 1922 from the Virginia Republican Congressional Convention; the state had imposed racial segregation in public places and disenfranchised most blacks by this time.

At the national level, the Republican Party made some attempts to respond to black interests. In 1920, Republicans made opposition to lynching part of their platform at the Republican National Convention. Lynchings, primarily of black men in the South, had increased in the decades around the turn of the 20th century. Leonidas C. Dyer, a white Republican Representative from St. Louis, Missouri, worked with the NAACP to introduce an anti-lynching bill into the House, where he gained strong passage in 1922. One of the black-and-tan partisans who continued to hold appointed office was Walter L. Cohen of New Orleans, the customs inspector and later comptroller of customs. He gained appointments from four Republican presidents and continued in office through the Calvin Coolidge administration.

During the NAACP national convention in 1926, the delegates expressed their disappointment with the party:

Aftermath

Lily-white/black-and-tan factionalism flared up in 1928, when Herbert Hoover tried to appeal to upper-class southern whites; and again in 1932 as the New Deal coalition built by Franklin D. Roosevelt began to attract African-American voters to the Democratic Party. Due to Democrats joining Republicans in supporting the civil rights movement and Congressional passage of the Civil Rights Act of 1964 and the Voting Rights Act of 1965, the shift of African Americans toward Democratic candidates accelerated.

According to author and professor Michael K. Fauntroy, the Lily-White Movement is one of the darkest and most "under-examined [eras] of American Republicanism".

Important figures
Lily-white leaders:
 James P. Newcomb, Republican Secretary of State of Texas between 1870 and 1874, journalist, and longtime influential Texas party leader.
 Jeter C. Pritchard, Republican U.S. Senator from western North Carolina between 1895 and 1903.
 William Howard Taft, Republican President between 1909 and 1913, who sought to expand Republican appeal in the South by eliminating black involvement.
 Herbert Hoover, Republican President between 1929 and 1933. He had alliances with black leaders, but broke with them in 1928 to gain Lily-white support in the South.

Leading opponents:
 Booker T. Washington, president of Tuskegee Institute in Alabama; he had close ties to leading Republicans and was a force in black politics.

Further reading
 Abbott, Richard H. The Republican Party and the South, 1855–1877 (University of North Carolina Press, 1986),
 
 Casdorph, Paul D. Republicans, Negroes, and Progressives in the South, 1912–1916 (University of Alabama Press, 1981). online
 
 
 Heersink, Boris, and Jeffery A. Jenkins. "Southern Delegates and Republican National Convention Politics, 1880–1928." Studies in American Political Development 29#1 (2015): 68–88. online 
  Hume, Richard L. and Jerry B. Gough. Blacks, Carpetbaggers, and Scalawags: The Constitutional Conventions of Radical Reconstruction (LSU Press, 2008); statistical classification of delegates.
 Jenkins, Jeffery A., and Boris Heersink. "Republican Party Politics and the American South: From Reconstruction to Redemption, 1865–1880." (2016 paper t the 2016 Annual Meeting of the Southern Political Science Association); online.
 
 Lisio, Donald J. Hoover, Blacks, & Lily-Whites: A Study of Southern Strategies (1985) online
 
 
 Trelease, Allen W. "Who were the Scalawags?." Journal of Southern History 29.4 (1963): 445–468. in JSTOR
 Valelly, Richard M. The two reconstructions: The struggle for black enfranchisement (U of Chicago Press, 2009).
 Walton, Hanes. Black Republicans: The politics of the black and tans (Scarecrow Press, 1975).
 Ward, Judson C. "The Republican Party in Bourbon Georgia, 1872–1890." Journal of Southern History 9.2 (1943): 196–209. in JSTOR
 Watts, Eugene J. "Black Political Progress in Atlanta: 1868–1895," Journal of Negro History (1974) 59#3 pp. 268–286 in JSTOR
 Wetta, Frank J. The Louisiana Scalawags: Politics, Race, and Terrorism during the Civil War and Reconstruction (2012) online review
 Wiggins, Sarah Woolfolk. The Scalawag in Alabama Politics, 1865–1881 (U of Alabama Press, 1977).

Primary sources
 Link, Arthur S. "Correspondence Relating to the Progressive Party's 'Lily White' Policy in 1912." Journal of Southern History 10.4 (1944): 480–490. in JSTOR

See also

 Black-and-tan faction
 Black suffrage in the United States
 Civil rights movement (1896–1954)
 Dixiecrat
 Nadir of American race relations
 Norris Wright Cuney
 Southern strategy

References

19th-century social movements
20th-century social movements
Anti-black racism in the United States
History of African-American civil rights
Defunct American political movements
Right-wing politics in the United States
Old Right (United States)
Republican Party (United States)
White supremacy in the United States